Bakhchysarai is a town in Crimea, a territory recognized by a majority of countries as part of Ukraine and annexed by Russia as the Republic of Crimea. It is the administrative center of the Bakhchysarai Raion (district), as well as the former capital of the Crimean Khanate. Its main landmark is Hansaray, the only extant palace of the Crimean Khans, currently open to tourists as a museum. Population:

Geography 
Bakhchysarai lies in a narrow valley of the  river, about 30 Kilometers south-west of Simferopol.

History

The earliest known artifacts of human provenance found in the valley date from the Mesolithic period. Settlements have existed in the valley since Late Antiquity. 
The founding of Bakhchysarai was preceded by the Qırq Yer fortress (modern Çufut Qale), Salaçıq, and Eski Yurt — these have become incorporated into the urban area of modern Bakhchysarai.

Bakhchysarai first appears in historical documents in 1502. In 1532 Sahib I Giray, the Khan of Crimea from 1532 to 1551, established his residence there. From that time it served as the capital of the Crimean Khanate and the center of political and cultural life of the Crimean Tatar people. In 1736 the town was burned during the Russo-Turkish War (1735–1739).  Following the annexation of the Crimean Khanate by the Russian Empire in 1783, Bakhchysarai became an ordinary town, having lost administrative significance. However, it remained the cultural center of the Crimean Tatars for several decades afterward, fostered by Ismail Gaspirali (1851-1914) who founded the local newspaper Tercüman in 1883.

During the Crimean War of 1853–56, Bakhchysarai essentially became a hospital town as wounded Russian soldiers from the battlefield were brought in to be treated. The Battle of the Alma, one of the earliest battles of the war, took place not far from the city in 1854. But although the city was close to the front line, the Turks and their European allies never took it, as the port city of Sevastopol was their primary wartime objective.

With the collapse of the Russian Empire in 1917 and the unification of several socialist republics that had been part of the Russian Empire, Bakhchysarai became part of the Soviet Union (established 30 December 1922) in 1922.

The Sürgün, the deportation of the Crimean Tatars by the Soviets during the Second World War, took place on 18 May 1944 in Bakhchysarai. The expulsion was prompted by accusations that the Tatars had collaborated with the Axis occupiers (1941-1944). Although deportation of some Tatars in Crimea had begun as early as 1860, during the era of the Russian Empire, the Sürgün delivered the final blow, as the city was rendered empty of Crimean Tatars. They were not to return to the city until 1989, when Soviet policies relaxed.

Bakhchysarai became a part of newly independent Ukraine in 1991. However, it became a de facto part of the Russian Federation when Russian Armed Forces invaded and annexed the city and the whole of Crimea in 2014.

Name and associations
Spellings of the town's name in different languages include:

 original Crimean Tatar: Bağçasaray
 Turkish: Bahçesaray
 Russian: Бахчисарай - Bakhchisaray
 Ukrainian: Бахчисарай - Bakhchysarai

The name comes from Persian  bāghche-sarāy, which means the Garden Palace. In Crimean Tatar, bağça means "garden" and saray means "palace".Russian-speakers associate the town with the Romantic connotations of  Alexander Pushkin's poem The Fountain of Bakhchysarai (1822). Adam Mickiewicz devoted some of the finest poems in his Polish-language Crimean Sonnets (1825) to the landmarks of Bakhchysarai.

An asteroid, 3242 Bakhchisaraj, discovered by Soviet astronomer Nikolai Stepanovich Chernykh in 1979, takes its name after the town.

Attractions
Famous attractions within or near Bakhchysarai are:
 Eski Yurt
 Chufut-Kale
 Khan's Palace
 Orta Juma Jami
 Tahtali-Jami Mosque
 Uspensky Cave Monastery
 Zincirli Madrasa

There is a network of well marked hiking trails around the town. All the main attractions are connected with red-marked trail.

Since 2011 thanks to the support of the Czech Government and USAID the Tourist information centre has been working.

Demographics 

In 1930 the population of the city was 10,450. The ethnic groups represented were 7,420 Crimean Tatars, 1,850 Russians, 315 Jews, 205 Greeks, 185 Ukrainians, 50 Germans, 30 Armenians, 30 Bulgarians, and 365 others.

Gallery

Education 

 College of Construction, Architecture and Design (Branch), Crimean Federal University

International relations

Twin towns – Sister cities
Bakhchysarai is twinned with:
 Bursa, Turkey

See also
 Bakhchysarai Palace

References

External links

 Official site of the Palace 
 History and monuments of Bakhchisaray 
 The murder of the Jews of Bakhchysarai during World War II, at Yad Vashem website.

 
Bakhchysarai Raion
Cities in Crimea
Crimean Khanate
Crimean Tatars
Islam in Crimea
Former capitals of Crimea
Holocaust locations in Ukraine